Old Nordic may refer to:
 Old Norse (Old Scandinavian), the most usual meaning
 Proto-Norse